The 2006 FC Dallas season was the tenth season of the Major League Soccer team. It was the most successful regular season in franchise history, and was the only time that the team secured the #1 seed in the Western Conference. After an elimination against the Colorado Rapids in a shootout in Game 2 of the Western Conference Semifinals, head coach Colin Clarke was fired and replaced by Steve Morrow.  It was also the final season under owner Lamar Hunt, who died soon thereafter.

Final standings

Regular season

Playoffs

Western Conference semifinals

U.S. Open Cup

External links
 Season statistics

2006
Dallas
FC Dallas